Mehmet Salim Şatıroğlu (1915 – 6 June 1987) was a Turkish former football player and coach. He spent the entirety of his career with his hometown club, Galatasaray SK.

Career
Şatıroğlu was born in Istanbul and played his entire career as a defender for Galatasaray SK. Like many other Galatasaray players at that time, he was a student of the Galatasaray High School and started playing football at the Grand Cour of the Galatasaray High School.

Şatıroğlu won the Istanbul Football League one times.

Honours

As player
 Galatasaray
 Istanbul Football League: 1948–49
 Milli Küme: 1939
 Istanbul Kupası: 1942, 1943

See also
List of one-club men

References

1915 births
1987 deaths
Footballers from Istanbul
Galatasaray S.K. footballers
Footballers at the 1928 Summer Olympics
Olympic footballers of Turkey
Galatasaray High School alumni
Association football defenders
Turkish footballers